Vincent Drouin (29 March 1932 – 1 September 1979) was a Liberal party member of the House of Commons of Canada. He was a lawyer by career.

He was first elected at the Argenteuil—Deux-Montagnes riding in the 1962 general election and re-elected there in 1963. Drouin was defeated after his second term, the 26th Canadian Parliament, in the 1965 election by Roger Régimbal of the Progressive Conservative party.

External links
 

1932 births
1979 deaths
Members of the House of Commons of Canada from Quebec
Liberal Party of Canada MPs
Lawyers in Quebec